Who Do We Think We Are is the seventh studio album by the English hard rock band Deep Purple, released in 1973. It was Deep Purple's last album with singer Ian Gillan and bassist Roger Glover until 1984’s Perfect Strangers.

Musically, the record showed a move to a more blues-based sound, even featuring scat singing. Although its production and the band's behaviour after its release showed the group in turmoil, with frontman Gillan remarking that "we'd all had major illnesses" and felt considerable fatigue, the album was a commercial success. Deep Purple became the top-selling U.S. artist in 1973. The album featured the energetic hard-rock single "Woman from Tokyo," a live staple of the band's since the album's release.

Recording

Who Do We Think We Are was recorded in Rome in July 1972 and Walldorf near Frankfurt in October 1972, using the Rolling Stones Mobile Studio.

"Woman from Tokyo," the first track recorded in July, is about touring Japan for the first time (e.g. the lyric "Fly into the Rising Sun"). The only other track released from the Rome sessions is the outtake "Painted Horse." The rest were recorded in Frankfurt after more touring (including Japan, which yielded Made in Japan). The group, riven with internal strife, struggled to come up with tracks they agreed upon. Members were not speaking to each other and many songs were finished only after schedules were arranged so they could record parts separately.

Of "Mary Long," Gillan said: "Mary Whitehouse and Lord Longford were particularly high-profile figures at the time, with very waggy-waggy finger attitudes… It was about the standards of the older generation, the whole moral framework, intellectual vandalism – all of the things that exist throughout the generations… Mary Whitehouse and Lord Longford became one person, fusing together to represent the hypocrisy that I saw at the time."

Ian Gillan left the band following this album, citing internal tensions – widely thought to include a feud with guitarist Ritchie Blackmore. However, in an interview supporting the Mark II Purple comeback album Perfect Strangers, Gillan stated that fatigue and management had a lot to do with it:

Added Jerry Bloom, editor of the book More Black than Purple:

The last Mark II concert in the 1970s before Gillan and Glover left was in Osaka, Japan on 29 June 1973.

Album title and artwork
The original album artwork has many quoted articles from newspapers. One of them is from magazine Melody Maker of July 1972, where drummer Ian Paice remarks:

 Another clipping simply has the Paice quote "I bought it so i'll bloody well boot it", which was his reply to an angry letter admonishing the drummer for kicking over his drum kit at the end of a live performance on the television show South Bank Pops from 1970.

On the back cover of earlier pressings, the opening track is listed as "Woman from Tokayo." Coincidentally, Ian Gillan's pronunciation of "Tokyo" does resemble this misspelling.

Release
Despite the chaotic birth of the album, "Woman from Tokyo" was a hit single and other songs picked up considerable airplay. In the United States, it sold half a million copies in its first three months, achieving a gold record award faster than any Deep Purple album released up to that time.

It hit number 4 in the UK charts and number 15 in the US charts. These numbers helped make Deep Purple the best-selling artist in the United States in 1973 (with the release of Made in Japan and the prior acclaim for Machine Head helping considerably).

In 2000 Who Do We Think We Are was remastered and re-released with bonus tracks. The last bonus track is a lengthy instrumental jam called "First Day Jam" that features Ritchie Blackmore on bass. Roger Glover, the group's usual bassist, was absent, allegedly lost in traffic.

In 2005 Audio Fidelity released their own re-mastering of the album on 24 karat Gold CD.

Reception

The album received mixed reviews. Ann Cheauvy of Rolling Stone reviewed the album negatively and, comparing Who Do We Think We Are to Deep Purple's breakthrough album In Rock, wrote that the former "sounds so damn tired in spots that it's downright disconcerting", and "the band seems to just barely summon up enough energy to lay down the rhythm track, much less improvise." In a retrospective critical review, Eduardo Rivadavia of AllMusic expresses the same opinion and writes that, apart from "Woman from Tokyo", the album's songs are "wildly inconsistent and find the band simply going through the motions", although he does praise "Rat Bat Blue".

On the contrary, reviewer David Bowling writes in the Blogcritics site that Who Do We Think We Are "is one of the band’s strongest and stands near the top of the Deep Purple catalogue in terms of quality", providing "some of the best hard rock of the era".

Track listing

Personnel
Deep Purple
 Ritchie Blackmore – guitar
 Ian Gillan – vocals
 Roger Glover – bass
 Jon Lord – keyboards
 Ian Paice – drums, percussion

Additional personnel
 Produced by Deep Purple
 Martin Birch – engineer
 Jeremy Gee, Nick Watterton – Rolling Stones Mobile Unit operators
 Ian Paice and Roger Glover – mixing
 Ian Hansford, Rob Cooksey, Colin Hart, Ron Quinton – equipment
 Roger Glover and John Coletta – cover design
 Peter Denenberg with Roger Glover – bonus tracks remixing (2000 edition)
 Peter Mew – remastering (original album tracks) and mastering (bonus tracks) at Abbey Road Studios, London (2000 edition)

Charts

Album

Weekly charts

Year-end charts

Singles

Certifications and sales

References

1973 albums
Deep Purple albums
Warner Records albums
Purple Records albums
EMI Records albums